Liudas Vilimas  (September 15, 1912 in Kušlėnai, Russian Empire (now Lithuania) – August 22, 1966 in Cleveland, Ohio) was a Lithuanian painter. His works included book illustrations, theatrical decorations, paintings, postal stamps, window showcases. His earlier works are expressionist, while later have features of abstractionism. While in Lithuania, he favored watercolors later transitioning to oil paintings and figure compositions.

In 1935, he graduated from Kaunas School of Arts. In 1938 he continued his studies in the Academy of Applied Arts Vienna, Austria. In 1940, he helped to establish Panevėžys Drama Theatre and was its chief decorator. After moving to Vilnius, he lectured at Vilnius Academy of Art and became director of Museum of Red Terror, which collected evidence of soviet persecutions during the first Soviet occupation of Lithuania. To avoid retaliation, he retreated to Germany ahead of the advancing Red Army. He helped Vytautas Kazimieras Jonynas to establish a Lithuanian art institute in Freiburg im Breisgau. In 1949, he immigrated to the United States, where he died in 1966.

References

Lithuanian painters
20th-century American painters
Lithuanian emigrants to the United States
1912 births
1966 deaths
Academic staff of the Vilnius Academy of Arts